Orchis galilaea is a species of orchid found from southern Turkey to Israel.

This species is pollinated by the bee Halictus marginatus.

References

External links 

galilaea
Flora of Israel
Flora of Turkey
Orchids of Lebanon
Flora of Palestine (region)
Taxa named by Joseph Friedrich Nicolaus Bornmüller
Taxa named by Rudolf Schlechter